The masked tityra (Tityra semifasciata) is a medium-sized passerine bird. It has traditionally been placed in the cotinga or the tyrant flycatcher family, but evidence strongly suggests that it is better placed in Tityridae, where it is now placed by the South American Classification Committee.

It is found in forest and woodland from Mexico, through Central America, to northwestern and central South America (as far south as Paraguay).

Measuring , it has a black-and-whitish plumage, and a distinct red eye-ring and base of the bill. The head is black in the male, while it is brownish or greyish in the female. The male resembles the black-tailed tityra, but can be separated by its smaller black face mask (does not include the nape) and white tail-tip.

References

Further reading

External links
 
 
 
 

masked tityra
Birds of Central America
Birds of the Yucatán Peninsula
Birds of Belize
Birds of El Salvador
Birds of Nicaragua
Birds of Costa Rica
Birds of Panama
Birds of Colombia
Birds of Venezuela
Birds of Ecuador
Birds of the Peruvian Amazon
Birds of Bolivia
Birds of Paraguay
masked tityra
Taxonomy articles created by Polbot